Walla Walla University is a private Adventist university in College Place, Washington. The university has five campuses throughout the Pacific Northwest. It was founded in 1892 and is affiliated with the Seventh-day Adventist Church.

The university has an annual enrollment of around 1,700 students. It is accredited by the Northwest Commission on Colleges and Universities and is also denominationally accredited. Walla Walla University offers more than 100 areas of study including preprofessional degrees and four graduate programs.

History 
In 1887, W.W. Prescott became the first education secretary of the General Conference of Seventh-day Adventists.  He noticed that Seventh-day Adventist schools were opening all over the place without a plan for long-term success, and decided to encourage these new Adventist schools to consolidate into larger, regional institutions that would stand a better chance of survival.  In 1890, Prescott visited the Pacific Northwest and asked the three Adventist schools there to merge; and after overcoming local opposition, the Adventist schools in Coquille, Portland, and Milton, all in Oregon, agreed to merge.  A committee chose to place the new school on forty acres of land located just west of Walla Walla, Washington that were donated for the school.  The new school opened on December 7, 1892, named Walla Walla College, and Prescott was named the first president.  However, Prescott was also president of two other institutions at the time, so Edward A. Sutherland, the principal, took over running the school's day-to-day activities and eventually became the second president of the college.

On the first day, Walla Walla College offered all education from elementary up to the first two years of college; total enrollment was 101, with six teachers.  All classes were run out of the four-storey tall administration building, deliberately built tall so that it could be seen from the city of Walla Walla.  Sutherland focused on following the counsels of Adventist prophetess Ellen G. White as closely as possible, and under his direction the school became the first to offer an exclusively vegetarian diet.  Likewise, he emphasized manual labour for the students.  Initially school finances were shaky, but the manual labour of the students eventually provided sufficient income to stabilize the school's finances.  The school's first graduation was held in 1896; three students graduated.

The school quickly celebrated a number of important milestones.  In 1895, the school became the first Adventist institution to allow a brass ensemble to play during church services.  In 1899, the first college bakery opened.  In 1901, Walla Walla College was incorporated.  In 1905, Marion E. Cady became the school's eighth president, and under his leadership the school expanded its college course offerings to a full four-year college program; by 1909, the college celebrated its first baccalaureate graduate.  Cady also stabilized the school's finances, which resulted in the college paying off its debt in 1909.  However, in 1910 the school suffered the first of many fires, when the power plant burned down.  In 1911, Ernest Kellogg took over as president, and under his leadership the academic program of the college was further strengthened; elementary and high school classes were moved to separate buildings, and the school received accreditation from the University of Washington in 1913 for its high school; in that same year, enrollment reached 400 students.  Kellogg designed the school's seal, and under Kellogg, the first yearbook was published, the first student newspaper was published, the student association was founded, and the alumni association was created.  The first school gym opened when Kellogg retired in 1917; the current cafeteria building is named after him.

In 1919, a fire destroyed the top floor of the school's administration building.  In the 1920s, Walla Walla College pursued accreditation for its college program, receiving accreditation for the first two years of its college program and also winning accreditation for its teacher training program.  However, the college met opposition from the church over its pursuit of accreditation, and suspended its application.  During this time period, OPS and AGA (dorm clubs) were founded, the Johnson Music Conservatory was built, and a fire burned down the women's dorm.  In the 1930s, Walla Walla College again pursued accreditation, and by 1935 it received accreditation for its full college program; in this same year, the high school separated from the college and became Walla Walla Valley Academy, leaving the school strictly a college.  By this time, Walla Walla College was the largest Seventh-day Adventist college in the world.  Walla Walla's success however led to further conflicts with the church, when several theology professors were fired in 1938 and the college president was forced to resign.

In 1939, the Columbia Auditorium opened, a popular performing arts venue.  In the 1940s, a number of important developments helped found some of Walla Walla's most popular programs.  An airfield was built in 1942 which led to the start of Walla Walla's aviation program.  In 1944, the present library building was completed, and in 1947 the present boys dorm was built.  In 1945, the village that had grown up to support the college was incorporated as the city of College Place, Washington.  In 1947, the university opened up the first school of engineering in the Seventh-day Adventist church, and the first physical education program started around the same time.  Also in 1947, the school opened its first satellite campus, when it began its school of nursing at the Portland Sanitarium, today Adventist Health Portland.  In 1948, the college's first master's program was offered in Biology, and a master's degree in Education began two years later.  A second satellite campus was opened in 1954 at Rosario Beach in Anacortes, Washington, for the marine biology program.  Enrollment more than doubled in the post-war years, reaching 1,300 by 1950.

Growth slowed in the 1960s as the college matured.  A church was built in 1962, the present-day University Church.  The college radio station, KGTS, began broadcasting in 1963, as the first FM-radio station in the Walla Walla Valley.  Several buildings were built towards the end of the decade.  The college also began to liberalize its rules, allowing its female students more freedom in how they dressed, and also hired its first full-time black professor.  In 1971, the university's engineering school was granted accreditation.

In the 1970s, the college ran into financial difficulties, and a number of college industries were closed, sold, or privatized in an effort to keep the school's finances under control.  To make matters worse, a fire damaged the women's dorm, and in 1978 a fire burned the Columbia Auditorium to the ground.  However, enrollment reached 2,000 by the middle of the decade.  In the 1980s, WWC reached out to alumni to help the school out, and an endowment fund began in 1987.  Also in 1987, a graduate program in social work began.

In the 2000s, the original administration building was condemned and torn down; a new administration building was built to replace it, designed to look as close as possible to the original administration building.  In 2007, the school was renamed Walla Walla University in light of the school's long-time status as a university.  Today enrollment fluctuates just under 2,000 students who are served by over 200 faculty and staff, across the university's five campuses.

Presidents
Past presidents of Walla Walla University:

 William Prescott (1892–1894)
 Edward A. Sutherland (1894–1897)
 Emmett J. Hibbard (1897–1898)
 Walter R. Sutherland (1898–1900)
 Edwin L. Stewart (1900–1902)
 Charles C. Lewis (1902–1904)
 Joseph L. Kay (1904–1905)
 Marion E. Cady (1905–1911)
 Ernest C. Kellogg (1911–1917)
 Walter I. Smith (1917–1930)
 John E. Weaver (1930–1933)
 William M. Landeen (1933–1938)
 George W. Bowers (1938–1955)
 Percy W. Christian (1955–1964)
 William H. Shephard (1964–1968)
 Robert L. Reynolds (1968–1976)
 N. Clifford Sorenson (1976–1985)
 H. J. Bergman (1985–1990)
 Niels-Erik Andreasen (1990–1994)
 W. G. Nelson (1994–2001)
 John C. Brunt (2001)
 N. Clifford Sorenson (2001–2002)
 Jon L. Dybdahl (2002–2006)
 John K. McVay (2006-2012)
 Steve Rose (2012)
 John K. McVay (2013–present)

Academics 
Walla Walla University is accredited by the Northwest Commission on Colleges and Universities, and also by the Adventist Accrediting Association.  Some of WWU's schools and departments are also accredited by agencies specific to their field.  WWU has authorization from both the state of Washington and the state of Oregon.

WWU offers pre-professional programs, Associate degrees, Bachelor's degrees, and Master's degrees.  The largest undergraduate programs are the nursing, engineering, business, biology, and education schools.

Walla Walla University is administratively divided into six schools and several departments.

School of Business 
The school of business offers a Bachelor of Business Administration among many other bachelor's degree programs, and is accredited by the Accreditation Council of Business Schools & Programs.  The school employs ten faculty, and currently operates from Bowers Hall.

School of Education and Psychology 
The school of education and psychology offers bachelor's degrees in education and psychology, and also offers master's degrees in education.  They also work with high school education candidates who are taking a major in their subject area.  The school prepares students to graduate with a Washington State teacher's certificate, but also offers the option to receive an Adventist education certificate.  The school employs 16 professors and support staff, and can be found in Smith Hall.

Edward F. Cross School of Engineering 
The Edward F. Cross School of Engineering was founded in 1947 by Edward F. Cross, for whom the school was later named.  It is the first engineering school in the Adventist education system.  It has been accredited by the Engineering Accreditation Commission of ABET since 1971.  The school offers a Bachelor of Engineering with four possible concentrations: civil, mechanical, electrical, and computer; and also offers a major in bioengineering.  The school employs 12 full-time professors and operates from the Chan Shun Pavilion.  The school also sponsors a chapter of Engineers Without Borders.

School of Nursing 
The nursing school was founded in 1947. It is accredited by the Commission on Collegiate Nursing Education.  The school offers a Bachelor of Nursing, which involves two years of study at the College Place campus, followed by two years of study at the Portland nursing campus, where nursing students get experience at Adventist Health Portland.

Wilma Hepker School of Social Work and Sociology 
The school of social work and sociology offers bachelors, masters, and doctoral degrees in social work, and a major in sociology.  Founded in 1975 by Wilma Hepker, the school has been accredited by the Council on Social Work Education since 1980, and operates satellite campuses in Billings and Missoula in Montana for its master's degree program.

School of Theology 
The school of theology is one of Walla Walla University's oldest programs.  It offers majors in theology, religion, and biblical languages.  It has employed a number of important Seventh-day Adventist theologians throughout its history, including Alden Thompson; and has graduated others, including Charles Scriven.  It employs nine professors and can be found inside the Walla Walla University administration building.

Other programs 
Walla Walla University's Department of Biological Sciences is one of its most popular programs, and is important to the university due to its operation of the Rosario Beach Marine Campus as well as being the university's oldest master's degree program.  Additionally, the department of music is historically important to Walla Walla University as one of its first bachelor's degree programs.

Campuses 
Walla Walla University has five campuses. They are located in Washington, Oregon, and Montana.

College Place Main Campus
The first campus of Walla Walla University remains its central campus.  Located just outside of Walla Walla, Washington, the campus was initially 40 acres before being expanded to the present-day 83 acres, in addition to 592 total acres in the local area.  The city of College Place, Washington sprung up shortly after the founding of the campus in 1892 to support the students and workers of the university.  Nearly the entire undergraduate program of Walla Walla University is located on this campus, and the graduate program in education is also located on this campus.  The oldest building on campus is Village Hall, which was built in 1920 as the original university church; today, it is used to put on drama productions, and the student development center operates from its basement.  Other old buildings on campus include Bowers Hall (1924), which currently houses the School of Business; and Conard Hall (1934), one of the women's dorms.  The campus includes Martin Airfield, opened in 1942 for the aviation department; and KGTS, the campus radio station, which heads the Positive Life Radio network that operates across Washington, Oregon, and Idaho.

Portland nursing campus
The School of Nursing operates a campus in Portland, Oregon adjacent to Adventist Health Portland, where third and fourth-year nursing students complete their practicum.  Opened in 1947, the campus includes a small dormitory for nursing students, named Hansen Hall.

Rosario Beach Marine Laboratory
The department of Biology operates a 40-acre campus on Rosario Beach, next to Anacortes, Washington.  The campus operates during the summer, offering courses in biology and marine biology.  The campus also supports courses in scuba diving.  The campus was purchased in 1954.

Montana campuses
The school of social work and sociology operates two campuses in Montana, at Missoula and Billings, in support of its graduate program in social work.  The Missoula campus opened in 1997, and the Billings campus opened in 2001.

Student government 
The Associated Students of Walla Walla University (ASWWU) was founded in 1914 as the Collegiate Association.  They were renamed ASWWC in 1922 and have only changed their name once since then, to match the renaming of the school from a college to a university in 2007.  They have published the school yearbook, Mountain Ash, beginning in 1915 as the Western Collegian, and since 1917 under its current title.  They have published the school newspaper, The Collegian, published under that title since 1916.  ASWWU has also published the school directory, The Mask, since 1954.

Adam Hagele, president; Omar Alfaro, executive vice president; Matthew Cosaert, spiritual vice president; and Tim Kosaka, social vice president; served as 2017-2018 officers. Katelyn Folkenberg, president; Evelyn Ouro-Rodrigues, vice president; Lindsey Haffner, spiritual vice president; and Madilyn Malott, social vice president followed as the first all female elected officers during the 2018-2019 year.

Omicron Pi Sigma (OPS) is the men's dorm club; it was founded in 1927.  It is responsible for organizing the annual mud bowl game—a football match played in a mud pit—as well as Amateur hour.  Aleph Gamel Ain (AGA) is the women's dorm club; it was founded in 1928.  It is responsible for organizing the annual AGA weekend on Mother's Day, when mothers are invited to visit their daughters in university.  Students who live off-campus are part of the Village Club.

Athletics 
The Walla Walla athletic teams are called the Wolves. The university is a member of the National Association of Intercollegiate Athletics (NAIA), primarily competing in the Cascade Collegiate Conference (CCC) since the 2015–16 academic year. The Wolves previously competed as an NAIA Independent within the Association of Independent Institutions (AII) from 2008–09 to 2014–15, and in the Pacific Northwest College Conference (PNCC) from 1994–95 to 1999–2000. They also were a member in the United States Collegiate Athletic Association (USCAA) from 2004–05 to 2012–13; and in the National Christian College Athletic Association (NCCAA) from 1997–98 to 2007–08.

Walla Walla competes in eight intercollegiate varsity sports: Men's sports include basketball, cross country, golf and soccer; while women's sports include basketball, cross country, golf and volleyball.

Club sports
Unofficially, Walla Walla was also affiliated with a men's ice hockey team, called the Wolfpack.

Campus Ministries 

The Chaplain's Office of the university includes departments of Campus Ministries and Student Missions.

Student Missions
While Walla Walla University students have been involved in mission work from the very beginning, the modern Walla Walla University Student Missions program began in 1960 when they sent out their first student missionaries overseas.  Today, Walla Walla University sends out between 50 and 90 student missionaries (SMs) each year, to locations around the world.  Many Seventh-day Adventist schools in Micronesia are staffed primarily by Walla Walla University student missionaries.

Notable people 

Alumni of WWU include business people such as Jeri Ellsworth, Peter Adkison and Forrest Preston, ornithologist Pamela C. Rasmussen, ophthalmologist and Order of Canada recipient Howard Gimbel, theologian Alden Thompson, and former lieutenant governor of Guam Michael Cruz.

Gallery

See also

 KGTS
 List of Seventh-day Adventist colleges and universities
 Seventh-day Adventist education

References

External links
 Official website
 Official athletics website

 
Universities and colleges affiliated with the Seventh-day Adventist Church
Education in Walla Walla County, Washington
Educational institutions established in 1892
Universities and colleges accredited by the Northwest Commission on Colleges and Universities
Buildings and structures in Walla Walla County, Washington
Tourist attractions in Walla Walla County, Washington
USCAA member institutions
Universities and colleges in Walla Walla, Washington
1892 establishments in Washington (state)
Private universities and colleges in Washington (state)